Kounov is a municipality and village in Rychnov nad Kněžnou District in the Hradec Králové Region of the Czech Republic. It has about 200 inhabitants.

Administrative parts
Villages of Hluky, Nedvězí, Rozkoš and Šediviny are administrative parts of Kounov.

References

Villages in Rychnov nad Kněžnou District